DeFerriere House is a historic home located at Oneida in Madison County, New York.  It is a -story, frame Greek Revival–style U-shaped dwelling.

It was added to the National Register of Historic Places in 2007.

References

Houses on the National Register of Historic Places in New York (state)
Greek Revival houses in New York (state)
Houses completed in 1832
Houses in Madison County, New York
National Register of Historic Places in Madison County, New York